Charles Paddock Otstott (born 2 June 1937) is a retired lieutenant general in the United States Army who served as Deputy Chairman of the NATO Military Committee from 1990 to 1992. He is a 1960 graduate of the United States Military Academy with a B.S. degree in engineering. Otstott later earned an M.S. degree in engineering from Purdue University in 1967. He is also a graduate of the Army Command and General Staff College and the National War College.

References

1937 births
Living people
United States Military Academy alumni
Military personnel from Dallas
United States Army Rangers
United States Army personnel of the Vietnam War
Purdue University College of Engineering alumni
United States Army Command and General Staff College alumni
Recipients of the Air Medal
Recipients of the Silver Star
National War College alumni
Recipients of the Meritorious Service Medal (United States)
Recipients of the Legion of Merit
United States Army generals
Recipients of the Defense Superior Service Medal
Recipients of the Distinguished Service Medal (US Army)